The John W. Mason House is a historic building located in Fergus Falls, Minnesota, United States. Mason was a native of Lapeer, Michigan and one of the first settlers in town. He arrived in 1871 to establish a law practice. He served in the Minnesota Legislature, he was the first mayor of Fergus Falls, and later served as its city attorney. Mason built a small home on this same lot in 1875, and replaced it with this house in 1881. It is a two-story wood-frame structure that features a limestone foundation, low pitch hip roof, and bracketed eaves. The wrap-around porch was added around the turn of the 20th-century, and the single-story bay window was added on the southeast corner about 1905. The house was listed on the National Register of Historic Places in 1986.

References

Houses completed in 1881
Italianate architecture in Minnesota
Fergus Falls, Minnesota
Houses in Otter Tail County, Minnesota
National Register of Historic Places in Otter Tail County, Minnesota
Houses on the National Register of Historic Places in Minnesota